José and Pilar is a Portuguese documentary directed by Miguel Gonçalves Mendes following the last years of the Nobel Prize winner José Saramago, chiefly through his relationship with his devoted wife, Pilar del Río. Highly praised by the critics and the audience, the film succeeds in portraying the tenderness, the genuine integrity and the deep humanity between the controversial writer and his wife. It gathers sequences from Madrid to Helsinki to Rio de Janeiro. It includes sequences life in Lanzarote, and during trips around the world (presenting José's books, signing autographs, making speeches) as well as their simple, transient and quotidian moments during the period José writes his "The Elephant's Journey". The film was produced by Miguel Mendes' JumpCut (Portugal), Fernando Meirelles's O2 and Pedro Almodóvar's El Deseo.

Plot
"The Elephant's Journey", in which Saramago narrates the adventures and antics of an elephant transported from the court of King John III of Portugal to that of the Austrian Archduke Maximillian, is the starting point of José and Pilar.

The film shows us their daily life in Lanzarote and their trips around the globe, and is a surprising portrayal of an author throughout the creative process of a couple who decide to change the world, or at least to make it a better place. The film shows us an unknown Saramago, unravels any preconceived ideas we may have about the man and demonstrates that genius and simplicity can indeed be compatible. José and Pilar is a glimpse into one of the greatest creators of the Twentieth Century and shows us that, as Saramago said, "everything can be told in a different way."

Cast 
 José Saramago, writer (Nobel Prize winner in Literary, 1998).
 Pilar del Río, journalist.
 Gael García Bernal, actor.
 Fernando Meirelles, filmmaker.

Accomplishments and nominations 
 Was shown in the Portuguese theaters for five months, an historical record.
 First Portuguese film co-produced with internationally highly ranked film production companies (O2 and El Deseio).
 First Portuguese film to open the International Documentary Film Festival of Lisbon (DocLisboa) (2010).
 The Portuguese film with widest distribution and largest audience ever to premiere in Brazil.
 One of the greatest word-to-mouth successes of the 2010 Rio de Janeiro Film Festival (world premiere), among three hundred other films.
 Opened the Ronda International Political Cinema Film Festival, introduced by the judge Baltasar Garzón.
 1300 people attended the Spanish premiere, in Madrid, on 17 January.[What year?]
 Shown at the Guadalajara International Film Festival, one of the most prestigious film festivals in Latin America (out of competition).
 Winner of the Audience Award in the São Paulo Film Festival.
 Nominated by the Portuguese Authors Society for Best Film (2011).
 Best Film of the year by Visão and top 5 Best Films by Time Out Portugal.
 Nominated for Best Film, Best Editing and Best Soundtrack by the Brazilian Academy of Cinema.
 Portuguese submission for a nomination for the Academy Award for Best Foreign Film.

Press 

 " (...) it's so carefully constructed that at times it feels like fiction, shuttling easily and with a surprising level of intimacy between Saramago, the public persona, and Saramago, the private man." in Variety (USA).
 "The film portrays Jose's clearheaded pessimism in his quests for human rights." in Cahiers du cinéma (Spain).
 "An amazing film about the love that tied them together amid the exhausting daily routine of a public figure." in Diário de Notícias (Portugal).
 "José and Pilar is a documentary, but a documentary that dissolves the illusion of the pure documentary. The end of a cicle. A monument to the glory of a writer." in Público (Portugal).
 "Miguel Gonçalves Mendes took four years to make this documentary but watching it makes us realize it will last for much longer." in Expresso (Portugal)
 "(...) a documentary about a unique relationship (...) you don't even have to be fond of José Saramago, his books or share his ideology to like José and Pilar." in Time Out (Portugal).

See also
 List of submissions to the 84th Academy Awards for Best Foreign Language Film
 List of Portuguese submissions for the Academy Award for Best Foreign Language Film

References

External links 
 
 
 http://www.josesaramago.org/
 Facebook Official Page (Portugal)

2010 films
2010 documentary films
Portuguese documentary films
2010s Portuguese-language films
Documentary films about writers
José Saramago